Badran may refer to:

People

Given name
Badran Al-Shaqran (born 1974), Jordanian football (soccer) player
Badran Turki Hashim al-Mazidih (c. 1978 – 2008), Muslim Sunni militant and member of al-Qaeda in Iraq

 Badran (surname), list of people with the surname

Places
Badran, India, village in Indian administered Kashmir
Khirbat Badran, town in the Amman Governorate of north-western Jordan
Shafa Badran area, area in the Greater Amman Municipality, Jordan

See also